Major General William George Haan (October 4, 1863 – October 26, 1924) was a senior United States Army officer. He commanded the 32nd Division during the final year of World War I, and served in numerous other conflicts during his career.

Early military service
William George Haan was born on October 4, 1863, near Crown Point, Indiana, the son of German immigrants Nicholas Haan and Anna M. Haan. He attended the United States Military Academy (USMA) at West Point, New York, from where he graduated twelfth in a class of forty-nine in 1889, becoming a second lieutenant in the Field Artillery Branch of the United States Army. Among his fellow graduates included several men who would, like Haan himself, become general officers, such as Charles Dudley Rhodes, Clement Flagler, Eben Eveleth Winslow, Frank Daniel Webster, Walter Augustus Bethel, Winthrop S. Wood, Chester Harding, William L. Kenly, Joseph D. Leitch, William S. Graves, George LeRoy Irwin, William Wright Harts, Edward McGlachlin Jr., Charles Crawford and William Lassiter. Charles Young was another distinguished graduate, becoming the first African American to attain the rank of colonel.

Haan was promoted to first lieutenant in August 1896. He was then made a Professor of Military Science and Tactics at Illinois Normal School (now Illinois State University). In 1898–1901 he served as captain of Volunteers, in both Cuba and the Philippines. He was made a captain of the Regular Army in February 1901, and was mustered out of the Volunteer service the next month. In 1905 he graduated from the United States Army War College, the same year he married, on August 16, to a woman named Margaret.

From 1903–06 he served as a member of the General Staff and went to Panama for Theodore Roosevelt. As Acting Chief of Staff of the Pacific Division, he assisted with relief work after the 1906 San Francisco earthquake. For the next several years, he was responsible for several coastal defense positions. In April 1907, he became a Major and in December 1911 he was promoted to lieutenant colonel. He again served on the General Staff from 1912–14, and in July 1916 was promoted to a colonel in the Coast Artillery.

32nd Division Commander during World War I

In April 1917, the same month of the American entry into World War I, he was given the temporary rank of brigadier general and assigned to command the 57th Field Artillery Brigade of the 32nd Division at Camp MacArthur, Texas. Troop E commanded by Captain John S. Coney was formed in Kenosha on May 10, 1917, and the division was officially formed on May 29, 1917. On August 26, 1917, Major General James Parker assumed command. Parker had previously been awarded the Medal of Honor during the Philippine–American War. Only two months later, the 32nd Division was activated in July 1917 at Camp MacArthur, Waco, Texas of National Guard units from Wisconsin and Michigan. In December 1917, Haan was promoted again to the temporary rank of major general and was commander of the division.

Division leadership was switched several times between Parker and Haan before the unit arrived in France in February 1918 under Haan's leadership, becoming the sixth U.S. division to join the American Expeditionary Forces (AEF). In July, it entered the line with the French 6th Army.

32nd Division combat in France and Germany
The division's men were the first American soldiers to enter cross the German border, piercing the famed and until this time invincible German Hindenburg Line of defense. Major General James Parker reassumed command on December 7, 1917, leading the unit into Alsace in May 1918, attacking  in seven days.

Origin of the 32nd Division nickname
During the Second Battle of the Marne, the 32nd Division captured Fismes, and during August their successful capture of Juvigny earned it the nickname "Le Terribles". A French general, impressed by their accomplishment, commented that they ""shot through every line the Germans put before it."  The division was nicknamed Les Terribles, honoring them for their unrelenting and successful attacks against the Germans. The division's shoulder patch, a line shot through with a red arrow, signifies its tenacity during World War I. It was the only American unit in General Charles Mangins famous 10th French Army, it fought in the Oise-Aisne offensive.

The division fought continuously for 20 days during the Meuse–Argonne offensive and penetrated the last German defensive stronghold, the Kriemhilde Stellung, crossing the Meuse River. Up to this point much of the war had been a stalemate, fought from static trench lines over the same few kilometers of terrain. It was for the fighting in the Meuse-Argonne that Haan would later be awarded the Army Distinguished Service Medal, the citation for which reads:

Their next objective was to flank the Germans at Metz. The division was the front line element of the Third U.S. Army. Members of the division marched  to the Rhine River. They were the first Allied army unit to pierce the famed German Hindenburg Line of defense. There they occupied the center sector in the Colbenz bridgehead for four months, during which they held 400 square kilometers and 63 towns. From May through November 1918, they were given only 10 days of rest. The division fought in three major offensives, engaging and defeating 23 German divisions. They took 2,153 prisoners and gained , pushing back every German counterattack. Their success was remarkable.

In November, following the armistice, Haan became commander of VII Corps for occupation duty. A few days later he was promoted to permanent brigadier general. In April 1919 he returned to the US, again in commamd of the 32nd Division, and after its inactivation again, he served as head of the War Plans Division at the War Department in Washington, D.C.. His permanent rank was advanced to major general in 1920, although he was forced to retire from the army in 1922, after over thirty years of continuous service.

Casualties and decorations

The 32nnd Division was still engaging German troops east of the Meuse River when the Armistice was finally signed. The division suffered a total of 13,261 casualties, including 2,250 men killed in action and 11,011 wounded, placing it third in the number of battle deaths among U.S. Army divisions. The American, French, and Belgian governments decorated more than 800 officers and enlisted men for their gallantry in combat.

All four division infantry regiments, the three artillery regiments, and the division's three machine gun battalions were awarded the Croix de Guerre by the Republic of France. The flag and standard of every unit in the division was authorized four American battle streamers.

Division deactivation and reorganization
Following the war's end, the division served in the Army of Occupation in Germany, commanded by Maj. Gen. William Lassiter. The division was inactivated on April 5, 1919. On July 24, 1924, the 32nd Division was reorganized again, composed of National Guard units from Wisconsin and Michigan. Its headquarters was home stationed at Lansing, Michigan.

Final years and retirement
In July 1920, Haan was promoted to major general and named director of the War Plans Division. He retired in May 1922 and was for a time associated with the Milwaukee Journal. He died at Washington, D.C., on October 26, 1924. He was buried in Section 4 of Arlington National Cemetery.

The , launched March 1945, was named in his honor.

Camp Haan, near Riverside California, was named for him. The camp was a World War II training base for coast artillery and anti-aircraft and later housed a prisoner-of-war camp.

References

Bibliography

External links

Arlington National Cemetery

|-

1863 births
1924 deaths
United States Army Field Artillery Branch personnel
Illinois State University faculty
Recipients of the Croix de Guerre 1914–1918 (France)
Burials at Arlington National Cemetery
People from Crown Point, Indiana
Recipients of the Distinguished Service Medal (US Army)
United States Military Academy alumni
United States Army generals of World War I
People from Indiana in the Spanish–American War
American military personnel of the Spanish–American War
United States Army War College alumni
United States Army generals
Military personnel from Indiana